Bondalen is a valley in the municipality of Ørsta, Møre og Romsdal, Norway.

A section of Norwegian County Road 655 (Fv655) runs through the valley, serving Sæbø and accessing the ferry that links traffic to and from the eastern leg of Fv655, across Hjørundfjorden.

Bondalen is located in the midst of the Sunnmørsalpene mountains, with the mountain Skårasalen just to the south.  The Hjørundfjord Church, a primary and secondary school, and a number of other community services for the area are all located in the valley.

See also
 Jon Hustad

References

Ørsta
Valleys of Møre og Romsdal